Fantasie was the 5th proper studio album by Münchener Freiheit and their highest charting, reaching #4 in the German charts.  The album spawned three hit singles, including the #2 hit, Solang' man Träume noch leben kann (held off the #1 spot by Always on My Mind by Pet Shop Boys).  Fantasie was also completely re-recorded with English lyrics and later released throughout Europe and the US as Fantasy.

The album contained an alternative version of "Solang' man Träume noch leben kann", performed entirely by the band without the orchestra and choir.

Track listing
 "Bis wir uns wiederseh'n" – 3:45
 "In Deinen Augen" – 4:41
 "Diana" – 4:17
 "Land der Fantasie" – 4:53
 "Mondlicht" – 3:05
 "So heiß" – 4:04
 "Zum allerersten Mal" – 3:22
 "Du bist dabei" – 3:45
 "Laß es einfach gescheh'n" – 4:08
 "Solang' man Träume noch leben kann" (version 2) – 3:25

All music by Stefan Zauner and Aron Strobel except "So heiß" (Stefan Zauner and Michael Kunzi)

All lyrics by Stefan Zauner and Aron Strobel

Personnel
 Stefan Zauner – vocals
 Aron Strobel – guitars
 Michael Kunzi – bass
 Alex Grünwald – keyboards
 Rennie Hatzke – drums

Produced by Armand Volker

1988 albums
Münchener Freiheit albums
CBS Records albums